Mahmut Bajraktarević (22 December 1909 in Sarajevo – 13 April 1985 in Bugojno) was a Bosnian mathematician and academician. He graduated from the University of Belgrade in 1933 and received his doctorate from the Sorbonne in 1953 with the dissertation Sur certaines suites itérées. Bajraktarević was a professor at the University of Sarajevo and had a great influence on the development of mathematics in Bosnia and Herzegovina. He contributed to the research areas of functional equations, iterative sequences and summability theory.

References

Further reading
.

1909 births
1985 deaths
People from the Condominium of Bosnia and Herzegovina
Bosniaks of Bosnia and Herzegovina
Bosnia and Herzegovina mathematicians
University of Belgrade Faculty of Mathematics alumni
University of Paris alumni
Academic staff of the University of Sarajevo
20th-century Bosnia and Herzegovina mathematicians
Yugoslav expatriates in France